Anshul Tewari is the founder and editor-in-chief of Youth Ki Awaaz (meaning "the voice of youth" in Hindi) a user-generated content publishing platform aimed at the youth of India and centered around social issues, which is also the largest youth-based media platform in India.

Youth Ki Awaaz 
When he was 17 years old, Tewari founded Youth Ki Awaaz (YKA) in 2008 while still in high school as a platform for Indian young people to share stories and issues that mattered to them, who felt issues relevant to them had been neglected by mainstream media. He continued working on YKA while at the University of Delhi, where he studied journalism.

Honors and awards 
Tewari was selected as a United Nations ITU Young Innovator in 2012. Tewari was named an Ashoka Fellow in 2015. Subsequently, he was named an INK Fellow. In 2018, Tewari was named to the Forbes 30 under 30 list in Asia for Media, Marketing & Advertising.

He serves on the board of Jhatkaa as a trustee, an organization whose mission is to build empower the Indian citizenry from the grassroots. He is also on the Board of Directors of Collectively, a World Economic Forum and Unilever collaborative non-profit.

Tewari participated in the Obama Foundation’s Town Hall in New Delhi on 1 December 2017.

References 

1990 births
Living people
Indian businesspeople
Delhi University alumni
Ashoka India Fellows